Gabriel Vargas may refer to:

Gabriel Vargas (cartoonist) (1915–2010), Mexican cartoonist
Gabriel Vargas (footballer, born 1983), Chilean footballer
Gabriel Vargas (footballer, born 2000), Venezuelan footballer
Gabriel Osorio Vargas, Chilean film producer

See also
Gabriel Vargas Santos Airport, airport in Columbia
Gabriel Varga (born 1985), Canadian kickboxer
Gabriela Vargas (born 1988), Paraguayan chess player